Margareth Tamara Maccarrone (born 22 June 1982), known professionally as Margareth Madè, is an Italian actress and former model.

Madè began her modeling career at the age of 15 and, in 2000, won WhyNot Agency's New Model Today contest in Milan. She has appeared on international fashion shows and television programs such as Donna sotto le stelle (2000/2002) and La Kore (2002), both broadcast by Rai Uno.

Madè made her film debut as Mannina in Giuseppe Tornatore's  Baaria (2008). She played Sofia Loren in the miniseries La mia casa è piena di specchi (2010).

Early life
Madè was born in Paternò, Sicily to an Italian father and Egyptian mother. They separated when she was 8, and Madè grew up between Adrano and Pachino. Born Margareth Tamara Maccarrone, she uses a stage name because of her surname's association with pasta.

Personal life 
On 20 August 2016, Madè married fellow Italian actor Giuseppe Zeno in a Catholic ceremony. The couple had two daughters: Angelica (born November 8, 2017) and Beatrice (born September 4, 2020).

Filmography

Film 
Baarìa, directed by Giuseppe Tornatore (2009)
Una donna per la vita, directed by Maurizio Casagrande (2012)
... e fuora, nevica, directed by Vincenzo Salemme (2014)
Andròn: the Black Labirinth, directed by Francesco Cinquemani (2015)
The Veil of Maya, directed by Elisabetta Rocchetti (2017)
, directed by Giovanni La Parola (2021)

Television 
 La mia casa è piena di specchi, directed by Vittorio Sindoni - Miniserie TV -  Rai Uno (2010)
 Il paese delle piccole pioggie, directed by Sergio Martino - Miniserie TV (2012)
 Buio, directed by Nicolaj Pennestri - Miniserie TV - Canale 5 (2013)
Il commissario Montalbano, episode Angelica's smile (2013)

References

External links 

 

Living people
1982 births
21st-century Italian actresses
Actors from Sicily
Italian female models
Italian film actresses
Italian people of Egyptian descent
Models from Sicily
People from Paternò